Henry Clay Davis (July 12, 1845 – April 22, 1912) was a Washington State pioneer, pharmacist, real estate businessman, and speculator who lived in Tacoma and Claquato. He came to Tacoma in 1878 and worked in the pharmacy business for eight years, co-owning a drug-store in the city. Over the years, the store was devastated by fire three times. Davis experienced big losses, and eventually extracted himself from pharmaceutical business, focusing for several years on Tacoma real estate. One of his achievements was the financing of the first-ever three-story brick building in the city. Davis actively participated in other Tacoma organizations: he worked as the city treasurer for three years, was a general agent for the Northern Pacific Railway in the city agency, and was a member of the first city military organization.

In later years, Davis kept making deals and investing in real estate in his native town, Claquato, located near Chehalis, Washington. He entered the mining business, investing in anthracite coal mines along the Cowlitz River.

From 1896 to 1900, Davis was a member of the board of curators of the Washington State Historical Society.

Early life, family and education

Davis was born on July 12, 1845, in Fort Wayne, Indiana. He lived there for five years, until the family moved to Portland, Oregon, in 1851. A year later, they moved to Washington state, settling near Cowlitz Landing, the historic canoe landing two miles from Toledo. The family lived there for a year before moving to Claquato, which was a promising town until the Northern Pacific Railway choose Chehalis as its station point in 1874, leaving Claquato an economic ghost town.

His parents were Lewis H. Davis and Susan Clinger, and Henry was one of seven siblings, having two sisters and four brothers. Davis' father served as a soldier in a number of wars. Henry was a pioneer of Washington State and made big contributions in founding and developing Claquato town's infrastructure and layout. Over the years, all of the Davis children were associated with the development of Washington State.

Davis went to the public schools of Lewis County.

Career

Davis first started to work at the family farm. After his father's death, he worked at different jobs until he decided to go to Tacoma.

Tacoma, Washington

Davis settled in Tacoma in 1878 and entered the pharmacy business there. He co-owned a drug-store with Doctor H. C. Bostwick, who was known as the first physician of the city. Davis worked in the pharmacy for about eight years. The drug-store was destroyed by fire three times, resulting in big losses for the owners, and eventually Davis left the business.

Davis was elected treasurer of Tacoma on June 1, 1881. He stayed at the position for three years, being re-elected on May 7, 1882, and June 7, 1883.

After his terms as city treasurer, Davis entered the real estate business, working in the field for several years. During this time, he built the first-ever three-story brick building in Tacoma, and later rented it for "good profit."

Living in Tacoma, Davis also worked as a general agent for the Northern Pacific Railway. In 1881, he became a member of the first Tacoma military organization.

Claquato, Washington

In 1888, Davis returned to live at his farm in Claquato, Washington. There, he invested in the anthracite coal mining business located on the Cowlitz River. The deposits in that area were then considered "the purest in the state or in the west."

Davis was still investing in property as a general speculator. As a real estate businessman, Davis donated  of Claquato land, at the time priced $100 per acre ($2,600 per acre in 2020 dollars), to the Independent Order of Odd Fellows Cemetery.

Other positions and activity

From 1896 to 1900, Davis was a member of the board of curators in Washington State Historical Society. At different times, he worked under the leadership of Arthur A. Denny, Washingtonian pioneer and one of Seattle's founders, and William Farrand Prosser, American politician, historian and Union Army colonel.

Personal life and death

Davis married Ida A. Scott in 1889. Originally from Pennsylvania, she emigrated to Washington State in 1884 with her family. Henry and Ida had a daughter Ethel Lillian Davis and a son Donald Jerome Davis.

The Davises were members of the Presbyterian church.

Davis died on April 22, 1912, in Claquato, Washington, and was buried in Claquato Cemetery. He left an estate estimated at $110,000 ($170,000), which was equally divided between his living family members: wife Ida and son Donald. Some funds were also allocated in support of Davis' blind sister.

See also 

 Fort Wayne, Indiana 
 Washington State Historical Society

Notes

References

Literature cited

External links 

 

Washington (state) pioneers
People from Fort Wayne, Indiana
Businesspeople from Tacoma, Washington
American pharmacists
American real estate businesspeople
American mining businesspeople
Businesspeople in the pharmaceutical industry
Speculators
1845 births
1912 deaths
19th-century American businesspeople